Lead(II) chromate is the inorganic compound with the formula (PbCrO4). It has a vivid yellow color and is generally insoluble.  Two polymorphs of lead chromate are known, orthorhombic and the more stable monoclinic form.  Monoclinic lead chromate is used in paints under the name chrome yellow.  It occurs also as the mineral crocoite.

Lead(II) chromate may also be known as chrome yellow, chromic acid lead(II) salt, canary chrome yellow 40-2250, Holtint Middle Chrome, chrome green, chrome green UC61, chrome green UC74, chrome green UC76, chrome lemon, crocoite, dianichi chrome yellow G, lemon yellow, king's yellow, Leipzig yellow, lemon yellow, Paris yellow, pigment green 15, plumbous chromate, pure lemon chrome L3GS.

Structure
Lead chromate adopts the monazite structure, meaning that the connectivity of the atoms is very similar to other compounds of the type MM'O4.  Pb(II) has a distorted coordination sphere being surrounded by eight oxides with Pb-O distances ranging from 2.53 to 2.80 Å.  The chromate anion is tetrahedral, as usual.

Applications 

Approximately 37,000 tons were produced in 1996. The main applications are as a pigment in paints, under the name chrome yellow.

Preparation
Lead(II) chromate can be produced by treating sodium chromate with lead salts such as lead(II) nitrate or by combining lead(II) oxide with chromic acid.  

Related lead sulfochromate pigments are produced by the replacement of some chromate by sulfate, resulting in a mixed lead-chromate-sulfate compositions Pb(CrO4)1-x(SO4)x. This replacement is easy because sulfate and chromate are isostructural. Since sulfate is colorless, sulfochromates with high values of x are less intensely colored than lead chromate.

Reactions 
Heating in hydroxide solution produces chrome red, a red or orange powder made by PbO and CrO3. Also, in hydroxide solution lead chromate slowly dissolves forming plumbite complex.

PbCrO4 + 4 OH−   →   [Pb(OH)4]2− + CrO42−

Safety hazards 
Despite containing both lead and hexavalent chromium, lead chromate is not particularly toxic because of its very low solubility. Lead chromate is treated with great care in its manufacture, the main concerns being dust of the chromate precursor. "[E]xtensive epidemiological investigations have given no indication that the practically insoluble lead chromate pigments have any carcinogenic properties".

In the 1800s, the product was used to impart a bright yellow color to some types of candy. It is used (illegally) to enhance the color of certain spices, particularly turmeric, particularly in Bangladesh.

Previously, its use was more widespread. Lead(II) chromate and "white lead", or lead(II) carbonate, were the most common lead-based paint pigments.

See also
Crocoite
Iranite

References 
Safety (MSDS) data for lead chromate
Chemical Profile for lead chromate
J.T. Baker MSDS

Chromates
Lead(II) compounds
Pyrotechnic oxidizers
Environmental impact of paint
Oxidizing agents